This is a list of active and extinct volcanoes in Papua New Guinea.

New Guinea

Admiralty Islands

Bougainville

D'Entrecasteaux Islands

New Britain

New Ireland

Offshore islands

References
 Volcanoes of the World

External links
 

Papua New Guinea

Volcanoes